Blues Masters at the Crossroads is a two-night Blues concert held in October at Blue Heaven Studios in Salina, Kansas. It features award-winning blues musicians performing in a Gothic-style church sanctuary, built in 1924, which was bought and converted into a modern Recording studio/concert hall by music entrepreneur Chad Kassem.

After the Salina First Christian Church congregation relocated, Kassem, the founder and owner of Acoustic Sounds, Inc., bought the building to provide more storage space for the international LP record and CD mail-order business he started in 1986.

Kassem decided to use the church sanctuary as a recording area due to its superior acoustics. His desire was to bring seasoned blues musicians from throughout the United States to record at Blue Heaven. His goal has been to document and showcase the authentic sounds of their music.

First concert
In August 1997, Jimmy Rogers performed the first concert at Blue Heaven. Beginning in 1998, Blue Heaven began hosting the Blues Masters at the Crossroads, traditionally held the third Friday and Saturday in October.

The two-night Blues Masters at the Crossroads seats 450 audience members each night in the original pew and balcony seats. In such an intimate, theater-style setting, the music emanates beneath a 42-foot vaulted ceiling supported by arching walnut beams. Four oak-trimmed stained glass windows at either side of the sanctuary interior gleam from the stage lights. There were 50 windows of varying sizes incorporated into the church design.

Each night’s Blues Masters performances run about five hours. The concert draws attendees from all over the nation and abroad.

Roll call of famed musicians
Many of the most important names in blues history have performed at the Blues Masters concerts, such as Hubert Sumlin, Lazy Lester, Bobby "Blue" Bland, Pinetop Perkins, Clarence "Gatemouth" Brown, David "Honeyboy" Edwards, Rosco Gordon, Bernard Allison and Snooky Pryor.

Most of the records made at Blue Heaven are for the APO Records label (Analogue Productions Originals), which specializes in all-analog, live-to-two-track recordings. During the Blues Masters concert weekend, artist recording sessions take place at the studio.

Gallery of Blues Masters musicians

See also
Blues Hall of Fame
List of blues musicians
List of Chicago blues musicians
List of Louisiana blues musicians

References

External links
Acoustic Sounds
Analogue Productions
APO Records
Blue Heaven Studios
Quality Record Pressings

Music festivals established in 1998
Blues festivals in the United States
Folk festivals in the United States
Music retailers of the United States
Companies based in Kansas
1997 establishments in Kansas